The Judson–Taft House is an historic house located at 46 Pleasant Street, in Uxbridge, Massachusetts.  The  story wood-frame house was built c. 1845–55, and is one of Uxbridge's most elaborate examples of high style Greek Revival design.  The house occupies a site overlooking the center of Uxbridge, and its front yard originally extended all the way to Main Street.  Its full two-story portico is supported by Doric columns, and its corner boards are pilastered.

On October 7, 1983, it was added to the National Register of Historic Places, where it is listed at 30 Pleasant.

See also
National Register of Historic Places listings in Uxbridge, Massachusetts

References

Houses in Uxbridge, Massachusetts
National Register of Historic Places in Uxbridge, Massachusetts
Houses on the National Register of Historic Places in Worcester County, Massachusetts